The Theodore Eldridge House is a historic building located on the east side of Davenport, Iowa, United States. It has been listed on the National Register of Historic Places since 1984.

History
Theodore Eldridge was a cousin of early Davenport settler and land speculator D.C. Eldridge. Theodore operated a restaurant and confectionery downtown where he lived upstairs until moving here in 1878.

Architecture
The Theodore Eldridge house is one of several Italianate style houses in Davenport that follow the Villa form of the style. It combines the rectangular shape and hipped roof of the basic style with a Villa-style tower. The most unusual feature of this house is its bowed front wall. It suggests the work of one of Davenport's first professional architects Willet Carroll.

References

Houses completed in 1878
Italianate architecture in Iowa
Houses in Davenport, Iowa
Houses on the National Register of Historic Places in Iowa
National Register of Historic Places in Davenport, Iowa